Jacques Grüber (25 January 1870 – 15 December 1936) was a French woodworker and glass artist.

Grüber was born in Sundhouse (Alsace).

In 1893, he made some decorations for Daum, some furniture for Majorelle and book covers for René Wiener.

In 1897, he founded his own studio where he specialised in glass working and stained glass windows, and in 1901 he was one of the founders of the École de Nancy. In 1914, he moved to Paris where he opened a studio in the 14th arrondissement. He died in Paris.

His son Francis Gruber was a famous painter and his son Jean-Jacques Grüber, was also a glass artist like his father.

Stained glass windows

References

External links
 Jacques Grüber et l'art nouveau 

1870 births
1936 deaths
People from Bas-Rhin
French woodworkers
Stained glass artists and manufacturers
Members of the École de Nancy
French cabinetmakers